Arrol Icefall is a steep icefall about  long, originating on the south side of Detroit Plateau, Graham Land, about  northwest of Cape Worsley. The 11-km long glacier featuring this icefall is situated southwest of Akaga Glacier and north of Aleksiev Glacier, and flows eastwards into Odrin Bay. The feature was mapped from surveys by the Falkland Islands Dependencies Survey (1960–61), and named by the United Kingdom Antarctic Place-Names Committee after the Arrol-Johnston car, which was adapted for use by Ernest Shackleton's Nimrod Expedition (1907–09) and was the first mechanical transport used in Antarctica.

References
 

Icefalls of Antarctica
Bodies of ice of Graham Land
Nordenskjöld Coast